The Great Appeal (Italian: Il Grande appello) is a 1936 Italian war film directed by Mario Camerini and starring Camillo Pilotto, Roberto Villa and Lina d'Acosta. It is sometimes known by the alternative title The Last Roll-Call.

Camerini was considered to have no sympathies with the Fascist regime of Italy, but he made this propaganda film that endorsed the colonial policies of the Italian government. It was one of a number of African-set films made during the Fascist era including The White Squadron (1936), Sentinels of Bronze (1937) and Luciano Serra, Pilot (1938). The film portrays the rediscovery of his patriotism of an Italian, who eventually dies for his country.

Synopsis
Giovanni Bertani is a rootless Italian emigrant who is currently running a hotel in French Djibouti. Although his son Enrico is serving with the Italian forces in the Second Italo-Ethiopian War he sells arms to the Abyssinian forces fighting them. Following a journey to Abyssinia Giovanni regains his sense of Italian identity, and is fatally wounded blowing up the shipment of arms to the Abyssinians.

Cast 
 Camillo Pilotto as Giovanni Bertani 
 Roberto Villa (dubbed by Mario Pisu) as Enrico 
 Lina d'Acosta as Pepita 
 Guglielmo Sinaz as Miller - il contrabbandiere d'armi 
 Bruno Smith as Il giornalista Patti 
 Pedro Valdes as Salvador 
 Nino Marchetti as Il chirurgo 
 Enrico Poggi as Un operaio genovese

References

Bibliography 
 Ben-Ghiat, Ruth. Fascist Modernities: Italy, 1922-1945. University of California Press, 2004.
 Gundle, Stephen. Mussolini's Dream Factory: Film Stardom in Fascist Italy. Berghahn Books, 2013.
 Palumbo, Patrizia. A Place in the Sun: Africa in Italian Colonial Culture from Post-unification to the Present. University of California Press, 2003.

External links 
 

1936 films
Italian war films
Italian black-and-white films
1936 war films
1930s Italian-language films
Films directed by Mario Camerini
Films set in Djibouti
Films set in Ethiopia
Italian propaganda films
Fascist propaganda
Films about fascism
Films set in Eritrea
Films set in the French colonial empire
Films about Fascist Italy
Italian neorealist films
1930s Italian films